Makaraka may refer to:

Makaraka (people), an African ethnic group
Makaraka, New Zealand, a suburb of Gisborne, New Zealand
Makaraka Racecourse, a racecourse in Makaraka, New Zealand